Princess Caroline Louise of Hesse-Darmstadt (11 July 1723 – 8 April 1783), was a consort of Baden, a dilettante artist, scientist, collector and salonist.

Biography

The daughter of Louis VIII of Hesse-Darmstadt and Charlotte Christine Magdalene Johanna of Hanau, she married on January 28, 1751, to Charles Frederick, Margrave of Baden.

She is described as learned, spoke five languages, corresponded with Voltaire and made Karlsruhe to a cultural centre in Germany where she counted Johann Gottfried von Herder, Johann Caspar Lavater, Johann Wolfgang von Goethe, Friedrich Gottlieb Klopstock, Christoph Willibald Gluck and Christoph Martin Wieland among her guests. She was a member of Markgräflich Baden court orchestra and the Danish Academy of Fine Arts, draw, painted in water colours and had a laboratory set up in the Karlsruhe palace. Carl von Linné named Glückskastanie Carolinea Princeps L. after her, and Friedrich Wilhelm von Leysser was hired to gather plants for her. She supported herself and managed a soap- and candle-factory. Her health was ruined by a fall in 1779, and she died by a stroke during a trip with her son.

Her collections were the foundation of the Staatliche Kunsthalle Karlsruhe and the State Museum of Natural History Karlsruhe.

Issue

 Charles Louis, Hereditary Prince of Baden (February 14, 1755 – December 16, 1801). Charles Louis's son, Charles Louis Frederick, succeeded Charles Frederick as Grand Duke upon the latter's death in 1811.
 Frederick (August 29, 1756 – May 28, 1817) married on December 9, 1791, Louise of Nassau-Usingen (August 16, 1776 – February 19, 1829), the daughter of Duke Frederick of Nassau-Usingen
 Louis I, Grand Duke of Baden (February 9, 1763 – March 30, 1830) married Countess Katharina Werner von Langenstein in 1818.  Louis succeeded his nephew Charles Louis Frederick as 3rd Grand Duke in 1818.
 Son (July 29, 1764 – July 29, 1764)
 Louise Auguste (January 8, 1767 – January 11, 1767)

Ancestry

Sources

|-

1723 births
1783 deaths
German salon-holders
Landgravines of Hesse-Darmstadt
House of Hesse-Darmstadt
Margravines of Baden
House of Zähringen
German entomologists
Women entomologists
Daughters of monarchs